The Post Hunt was an annual puzzlehunt in Washington, DC. It was co-created by Miami Herald columnist Dave Barry, along with Gene Weingarten and Tom Shroder. The Post Hunt debuted in 2008. The most recent hunt took place on May 22, 2016. The hunt was discontinued in 2017. It was a renamed version of the Tropic Hunt, also created by Barry, Weingarten and Shroder, which had a long run in Miami, FL.

The Washington Post Magazine held a Hunt in downtown Washington DC, attended by about 5,000 people, including dozens who came up from South Florida. In 2015, for the first time in 10 years, Gene Weingarten, now a columnist for the Post Magazine, joined Shroder, now editor of the Post Magazine, and Barry in designing the Hunt.

Format 
The Hunt consists of three parts. Answering the "opening questions" directs Hunters to five puzzle sites scattered through the Hunt area. Solving the five Hunt puzzles—the answer is always a number—indicates the five authentic clues on a list of dozens of numbered bogus clues. Hunters have three hours to solve the puzzles, then at 3 p.m., a sixth and final clue is announced from the main stage. This begins the "endgame", which is by far the most difficult puzzle of the day. Solving the endgame often leads to a phone number, or directs Hunters to go to a certain out-of-the-way location and give a password to someone identified in a cryptic way.

Previous Winners 
The winners of the 2016 Washington Post hunt were Benjamin McRae, Erin McRae, Mark Swiatek, and Michael Engard

The winners of the 2015 Washington Post hunt were Todd Etter, Chris Guthrie, Matthew Hartman, and Charlie Scarborough

The winners of the 2014 Washington Post Hunt were Todd Etter, David Forrest, Chris Guthrie, and Charlie Scarborough

The winner of the 2013 Washington Post Hunt was solo participant Sean Memon 

The winners of the 2012 Washington Post Hunt were:
Phil Spector, 35, of Washington;
Sabita Soneji, 35, of Washington;
John Mackedon, 34, of Washington;
Mark Cackler, 57, of Falls Church;
Timothy Bouley, 31, of Washington;
Madalina Cristoloveanu, 31, of Washington;
Kris White, 29, of Washington;
Sean Sharifi, 30, of Vienna;
Nicole Mechem, 32, of Washington;
Damon Taaffe, 35, of Arlington;
Alva Kretschmer, 27, of Washington;
Patricia Van de Velde, 27, of Washington

The winners of the 2011 Washington Post Hunt were Sean and Diana Viera, Alex Elliott, Kevin Chang, James Auwaerter, Amy Posten and Galen Mullins

The winners of the 2010 Washington Post Hunt were John Sanders, Eana Chung, Eric Pilar, Chris Wong, Suzanne Schwartz, Joe Grossman and Katie Elder

The winners of the 2009 Washington Post Hunt were David Shahoulian, Emma Filstrup, Serena Hoy, Jim Reilly, Jenny Hunter, and Tom Jawetz

The winners of the 2008 Washington Post Hunt were Todd Etter, David Forrest, Chris Guthrie, and Jack Reda

References

External links
 Official site
 The Tropic/Herald Hunt Archives

Puzzle hunts